General Gray may refer to:

Alfred M. Gray Jr. (born 1928), U.S. Marine Corps general
Carl R. Gray Jr. (1889–1955), U.S. Army major general
Sir George Gray, 3rd Baronet (c. 1710–1773), British Army lieutenant general
Henry Gray (politician) (1816–1892), Confederate States Army brigadier general
Michael Gray (British Army officer) (1932–2011), British Army lieutenant general
Sue Gray (RAF officer) (born 1963), Royal Air Force air marshal

See also
General Grey (disambiguation)
Attorney General Gray (disambiguation)